The 1928–29 season was Real Sociedad's first season in La Liga. As one of the six clubs to have won the cup Real Sociedad were invited to take part and were thus one of the founding members of the 1st division.

League matches were played from February to June 1929. Real Sociedad finished in 4th position.
In the King Alfonso XIII's Cup Real Sociedad faced Patria Aragón, who they beat with ease. In the next round Real Sociedad were knocked out by FC Barcelona, the holders.

Squad

Player stats

League results

Final position in the league

External links
 Real Sociedad Squad
 All fixtures listed

Spanish football clubs 1928–29 season
Real Sociedad seasons